Christophe Guilloteau (born 18 June 1958 in Lyon) was a member of the National Assembly of France.  He represented Rhône's 10th constituency from 2003 to 2017, as a member of the Union for a Popular Movement.

References

1958 births
Living people
Politicians from Lyon
Union for a Popular Movement politicians
The Popular Right
Deputies of the 13th National Assembly of the French Fifth Republic
Deputies of the 14th National Assembly of the French Fifth Republic